Mattar Bin Lahej (born 1968) is an Emirati painter, photographer and sculptor from Dubai. He founded Marsam Mattar, the first art gallery in the United Arab Emirates to be managed by an artist.

Group exhibitions 
2015 Sikka Art Fair, Dubai,UAE
2013 Emirati Expressions, Saadiyat Island, UAE
2012 Liquid Identity, Venice, Italy 
2012 Signature, Manama, Bahrain
2012 First impression, Ludhiana,India 
2011 Art Dubai, Dubai,UAE
2010 Acela Festival, Morocco 
2010 Washington DC, USA
 2009 Art Abu Dhabi, UAE
2009 Emirati Expressions, Saadiyat Island, UAE
1996 Sharjah Biennial, Sharjah, UAE

Solo exhibitions 
 2012 Index, Dubai, UAE
 2011 Index, Dubai, UAE
 2010 Contemporary Istanbul, Turkey
 2009 UAE Cultural Days, Germany
 2009 " Movement of stillness” Mattar Gallery, Dubai. 
 2008 “Abu Dhabi in colors" Fair ground, Abu Dhabi

See also 

List of Arab artists
List of Emirati artists

References 

Emirati contemporary artists
Emirati photographers
Emirati sculptors
1968 births
Living people
People from Dubai